Tell is both a given name and a surname. Notable people with the name include:

Given name
 Tell Berna (1891–1975), American long-distance runner and Olympic gold medalist
 Tell Taylor (1876–1937), American songwriter

Surname

 Alma Tell (1898-1937), American actress
 Christian Tell (1808–1884), Wallachian and Romanian politician
 Christine Tell, Canadian politician
 David Tell, American conservative political journalist
 Marvell Tell (born 1996), American football player
 Olive Tell (1894–1951), American actress
 William Tell, legendary Swiss hero
 William Tell (musician) (born 1980), American rock musician
 Zak Tell (born 1970), Swedish musician and lead singer

See also
 Tell (disambiguation)
 Jeroen Tel, computer game musician
 Teller (disambiguation)